Kyle Stuart Morton (born March 31, 1994) is an American professional soccer player who plays as a goalkeeper for Louisville City FC in the USL Championship.

Career

College and amateur
Morton attended Henderson High School, where he played on the school soccer team and served as the team captain as a senior.  He played club soccer for Penn Fusion and also spent time with the Philadelphia Union Academy.

Morton played college soccer at James Madison University between 2012 and 2016, receiving a medical redshirt during 2013.  He made third team All-CAA for his final three seasons.

While in college, Morton also played with Premier Development League sides Reading United AC, Lehigh Valley United and OKC Energy U23.

Professional

Rochester Rhinos 
Morton signed his first professional deal with United Soccer League club Rochester Rhinos on March 7, 2017. He made his Rhinos debut on May 18 in a 3–0 win over FC Motown in a U.S. Open Cup match.  That would be his only appearance for Rochester and following the 2017 season, the team decided to go on hiatus.

Pittsburgh Riverhounds 
On January 26, 2018, Morton joined USL side Pittsburgh Riverhounds.  He made his Riverhounds debut on April 7, keeping a clean sheet in a 4–0 victory against Toronto FC II.  He ended his first season in Pittsburgh with 3 appearances and 3 clean sheets, missing most of the season due to a torn ACL.

In 2018, Morton made 24 appearances in the regular season and kept 13 clean sheets, tied for 2nd most in the league, helping the Riverhounds finish first in the Eastern Conference.  He played in both of Pittsburgh's playoff games as the Riverhounds reached the Conference Semifinals, where they lost 2–1 to Louisville City in extra time.

Saint Louis FC 
On January 3, 2020, Morton moved to USL Championship side Saint Louis FC. He made his debut for Saint Louis on March 7, a 4–1 win over Miami FC.  In a shortened season due to the COVID-19 pandemic, Morton made 14 appearances and kept 2 clean sheets to help Saint Louis qualify for the playoffs.  He played in both of their playoff games as Saint Louis reached the Conference Semifinals, where they lost to Louisville City 2–0.  Saint Louis FC folded following the 2020 USL Championship season.

Houston Dynamo 
Morton signed with Major League Soccer side Houston Dynamo on January 27, 2021. On July 9, 2021, Morton was loaned to USL Championship side Memphis 901. He made his debut for Memphis on July 10, making 8 saves and keeping a clean sheet in a 1–0 win over Birmingham Legion.  Morton was named USL Championship Player of the Week and made the Team of the Week following his performance against Birmingham.  He made 5 appearances while with Memphis, keeping 2 clean sheets.  Houston recalled him from his loan on August 18.  On November 3, in the final game of Houston's season, Morton made his Dynamo and MLS debut, making 4 saves in a 2–0 loss to CF Montréal. Following the 2021 season, Morton's contract option was declined by Houston.

Louisville City FC
Morton signed with Louisville City FC on December 28, 2021.

Career statistics

Honors
Individual
USL Championship Golden Glove: 2022

USL Championship All League Second Team : 2022

Personal
Morton attended Henderson High School, where he played on the school soccer team as well as on the school football team as kicker.  He attended James Madison University, where he majored in kinesiology.

His brother is fellow professional soccer goalkeeper, Todd Morton, who currently plays for Philadelphia Union II.

References

1994 births
Living people
American soccer players
Association football goalkeepers
Houston Dynamo FC players
James Madison Dukes men's soccer players
Lehigh Valley United players
Major League Soccer players
Memphis 901 FC players
People from West Chester, Pennsylvania
Pittsburgh Riverhounds SC players
Reading United A.C. players
Rochester New York FC players
Saint Louis FC players
Louisville City FC players
Soccer players from Pennsylvania
Sportspeople from Chester County, Pennsylvania
USL Championship players
USL League Two players